Marino Lombardo (9 April 1950 – 9 March 2021) was an Italian professional football player and coach.

Career
Lombardo, a full back, began his career with Torino, and later played for Cesena, Pistoiese, Pescara, Triestina, Arezzo and Pro Gorizia.

After retiring as a player in 1983 he worked as a coach, including for Triestina with whom he won promotion.

He died of a heart attack on 9 March 2021, aged 70.

References

1950 births
2021 deaths
Italian footballers
Torino F.C. players
A.C. Cesena players
U.S. Pistoiese 1921 players
Delfino Pescara 1936 players
U.S. Triestina Calcio 1918 players
S.S. Arezzo players
A.S. Pro Gorizia players
Serie A players
Serie B players
Association football fullbacks
Italian football managers
U.S. Triestina Calcio 1918 managers